The Missing Lady is a 1946 American mystery film directed by Phil Karlson and starring Kane Richmond and Barbara Read. It was the third and final in a series of three films released by Monogram in 1946 starring Richmond as The Shadow, the others being The Shadow Returns and Behind The Mask.

Synopsis
Lamont Cranston, alias The Shadow, investigates when an art dealer is murdered and his valuable jade statuette is stolen.

Cast 
Kane Richmond as Lamont Cranston (The Shadow)
Barbara Read as Margo Lane
Pierre Watkin as Commissioner Weston
Claire Carleton as Rose Dawson
Garry Owen as Johnson

Reception
Critic Leonard Maltin wrote that of the three Monogram Shadow films released in 1946, The Missing Lady was "the best of the series, played like a straight film noir and offering a few surprise twists."

References

External links 

1946 mystery films
American crime films
Monogram Pictures films
The Shadow films
1946 films
1946 crime films
American mystery films
Films directed by Phil Karlson
American black-and-white films
1940s English-language films
1940s American films